Riku Rantala (born 20 July 1974) is a Finnish journalist, best known from traveling series Madventures. He has also co-written a book, Isänmaan asialla - matkaopas syrjäytettyjen Suomeen (Johnny Kniga, 2004), with Ari Lahdenmäki. In 2007, Rantala, Lahdenmäki and Tuomas "Tunna" Milonoff, the 2nd of Madventures' presenters, published Madventures: Kansainvälisen seikkailijan opas (Johnny Kniga, 2007). The book is a guidebook for new travelers and gives advice and insight into the world of backpacking.

Rantala has studied journalism in the University of Tampere.

Awards
In 2010, Riku Rantala was selected as the best male TV-person in the Kultainen TV (literally Golden TV) awards. In the same event, Madventures won the award for best television program. Both awards were decided in a vote by television viewers.  

In 2012 the Ministry of Education and Culture of Finland awarded Rantala and Milonoff for advancing the geographical and global knowledge especially among the young people.

References

External links

1974 births
Finnish journalists
Living people